Acianthera bidentata is a species of orchid plant native to southeast Brazil. It is synonymous with Pleurothallis bidentata and  Humboltia bidentata

References 

bidentata
Flora of Brazil
Plants described in 1835